Clark Township is one of nine townships in Johnson County, Indiana. As of the 2010 census, its population was 2,460 and it contained 863 housing units.

History
Clark Township was organized in 1838. It was named in honor of the Clark family of pioneer settlers.

The Heck-Hasler House was listed on the National Register of Historic Places in 2000.

Geography

References

External links
 Indiana Township Association
 United Township Association of Indiana

Townships in Johnson County, Indiana
Townships in Indiana